Erric Demont Pegram (born January 7, 1969) is a retired professional American football player who was selected by the Atlanta Falcons in the sixth round of the 1991 NFL Draft. A 5'9", 188-pound running back from the University of North Texas, Pegram played in seven National Football League (NFL) seasons from 1991-1997. He played high school football at Hillcrest High School, a perennial powerhouse.

Pegram's best season as a pro was during the 1993 season with the Falcons, rushing for 1,185 yards and three touchdowns. In a game that season against the San Francisco 49ers on September 19, 1993, Pegram ran for 192 yards on 27 carries. Two years later, he found himself as the leading rusher for the Pittsburgh Steelers with 813 yards and led them to a trip to Super Bowl XXX, only to lose to the Dallas Cowboys 27-17. He ended his career after the 1997 NFL season when he split time between the New York Giants and San Diego Chargers.

Pegram lives in Naples, Florida, is married to Michelle Pegram, a school teacher. He has four daughters; Alexandria, Taylor a former track athlete at UNLV, Nadia a tennis athlete at Howard University, and Natalia a freshman in high school. 

1969 births
Living people
People from Dallas
American football running backs
North Texas Mean Green football players
Atlanta Falcons players
Pittsburgh Steelers players
New York Giants players
San Diego Chargers players
Hillcrest High School (Dallas) alumni